The 1983 Big Eight men's basketball tournament was held March 10–12 at a combination of on-campus gymnasiums and Kemper Arena in Kansas City, Missouri.

Number 3 seed Oklahoma State defeated top-seeded Missouri in the championship game, 93–92 in double overtime, to win their first Big Eight men's basketball tournament.

The Cowboys received an automatic bid to the 1983 NCAA tournament. They were joined in the tournament by fellow Big Eight members Missouri and Oklahoma, who earned at-large bids.

Format
All eight of the conference's members participated in the tournament field. They were seeded based on regular season conference records, with all teams placed and paired in the initial quarterfinal round.

All first-round games were played on the home court of the higher-seeded team. The semifinals and championship game were played at Kemper Arena in Kansas City, Missouri.

Bracket

References

Tournament
Big Eight Conference men's basketball tournament
Big Eight Conference men's basketball tournament
Big Eight Conference men's basketball tournament